Appleton is a civil parish and suburb of Warrington, in the Warrington district, in the ceremonial county of Cheshire, England.

Geography and landmarks
The A49 road runs from neighbouring Stockton Heath up the hill into Appleton and links Warrington town centre with the M56 motorway.

At the top of Appleton is Warrington Golf Club. There is also a large cemetery situated nearby which is named Fox Covert Cemetery. The cemetery is locally called Hillcliffe. 

There are four schools in Appleton: Bridgewater High School, Broomfields Junior School, St Monica's Catholic Primary School and Cobbs Infant and Nursery School.

See also

Listed buildings in Appleton, Cheshire

External links 
 
 

Civil parishes in Cheshire
Geography of Warrington